Il mostro is a 1977 Italian thriller film directed by Luigi Zampa and starring Johnny Dorelli.

Cast
Johnny Dorelli as Valerio Barigozzi
Sydne Rome as Dina 
Orazio Orlando as Commissioner Pisani
Renzo Palmer as Baruffi
Enzo Santaniello as Luca Barigozzi
Renato Scarpa as Livraghi
Yves Beneyton as Giorgio Mesca
Gianrico Tedeschi as Vittorio Santi, "Grandpa Gustavo"
Clara Colosimo as Donatella Domenica Donati
Angelica Ippolito as Anna

References

External links

1977 films
1970s thriller films
1970s Italian-language films
Italian thriller films
Films directed by Luigi Zampa
Films scored by Ennio Morricone
Films with screenplays by Sergio Donati
1970s Italian films